Dame Ann Elizabeth Mary Leslie, DBE (born 28 January 1941) is a British journalist who writes for the Daily Mail.

Education
Leslie was born in Rawalpindi, British India (now in Pakistan), where she spent her early years, attending an English-language school and "witnessed the killing trains of Partition". In 1950, her parents sent her to boarding school in England, where she attended the Presentation Convent School in Matlock, Derbyshire, and St Leonards-Mayfield School, East Sussex. She went on, two years later, to attend Lady Margaret Hall, Oxford.

Career
Her first job in journalism was at the Daily Express in Manchester in 1962. Leslie moved to the Daily Mail in 1967. She has interviewed major film stars, entertainers, and political figures and has reported on numerous wars, civil conflicts and political stories in around 70 countries. At the Reuters/Press Gazette launch of the Newspaper Hall of Fame, she was named as one of the most influential journalists of the last forty years. In David Randall's The Great Reporters (celebrating the 13 best British and American journalists of all time) she is profiled as "the most versatile reporter ever".

She is a regular current affairs broadcaster on the BBC (Question Time, Any Questions?, Dateline London), Sky News, and international broadcasting organisations.

Leslie was interviewed by National Life Stories (C467/18) in 2007–8 for the 'Oral History of the British Press' collection held by the British Library.

Leslie was interviewed in the 2012 documentary The Diamond Queen, about Queen Elizabeth II.

Episodes in reporting

Significant events on which she reported include the fall of the Berlin Wall, the failed coup against Mikhail Gorbachev, and Nelson Mandela's final walk to freedom. She has made secret interviews in Iran and North Korea.
After a dangerous experience at a Zimbabwean ZANU farm, Leslie went back to the press hotel in Harare where other reporters sent back stories without venturing out of the hotel. She called them Avon ladies; only interested in make-up (as in made up stories).

Her memoir, Killing My Own Snakes, was published in 2008.

Awards
Leslie has won nine British Press Awards and has won two Lifetime Achievement Awards. In 1999, she was awarded the James Cameron Award for international reporting. She was created a DBE on 30 December 2006, for her "services to journalism". In 2012, Leslie won the Outstanding Contribution to Journalism Award at the eighth annual International Media Awards in London on 5 May 2012. She was recognized as one of the BBC's 100 women of 2013.

References
References

Sources
Biographical article at theguardian.com

External links
Short biography upon becoming a Dame (BBC, 30 December 2006)
BBC biodata on Leslie

1941 births
Living people
People from Rawalpindi
Alumni of Lady Margaret Hall, Oxford
English journalists
Daily Mail journalists
Women war correspondents
English television personalities
Dames Commander of the Order of the British Empire
People from Matlock, Derbyshire
People educated at St Leonards-Mayfield School
English expatriates in Pakistan
BBC 100 Women